PP-36 Sialkot-II is a Constituency of Provincial Assembly of Punjab.

General elections 2013

General elections 2008

See also
 PP-35 Sialkot-I
 PP-37 Sialkot-III

References

External links
 Election commission Pakistan's official website
 Awazoday.com check result
 Official Website of Government of Punjab

Constituencies of Punjab, Pakistan